Cairo Fernandes Santos (born 12 November 1991) is a Brazilian professional American football placekicker for the Chicago Bears of the National Football League (NFL). He played college football at Tulane, and was signed by the Kansas City Chiefs as an undrafted free agent in 2014. Santos has also played for the Los Angeles Rams, Tampa Bay Buccaneers, and the Tennessee Titans.

He is the first Brazilian born player in NFL history.

Early life
Born in Limeira, in the state of São Paulo, Brazil, Santos was raised in Brasilia, the capital, where his father worked as a pilot for Varig. Santos was unfamiliar with American football until he moved to St. Augustine, Florida, as a foreign exchange student at age 15. Originally, Santos planned to stay at St. Joseph Academy for one year to learn English, but soon found that the kicking skills he had developed playing soccer in Brazil translated well to field goal kicking in American football. With the opportunity to earn a college scholarship, Santos remained in Florida, sharpening his kicking skills through high school.

College career
Santos committed to Tulane on 22 January 2010. Santos also received interest from Georgia Tech, Jacksonville, and Miami (OH). Santos played in all 12 games his freshman year and was named to the Conference USA All-Freshman Team and was honorable-mention All C-USA after leading the Green Wave in points scored while making 13 of his 16 field goal attempts, 32 of his 33 PATs, and handling kick off duties. In his sophomore season, Santos played in all 13 games and finished second on the team in scoring making 11/18 field goals and 33/34 PATs while handling kickoffs and punting duties averaging 41 yards a punt.

The 2012 was a breakout season for Santos as he went 26 of 27 on PATs (his only miss was blocked) and a perfect 21 of 21 on field goals, including a school record 57-yard field goal. He became only the second kicker to make at least 20 in a season without a miss. 12 of those field goals were from 40-plus yards and 2 from 50-plus and 31 of his 55 kickoffs went for touchbacks. At the end of the season, Santos was named consensus All-American and received the Lou Groza Award for the nation's most outstanding placekicker.

Santos went on to compete in the 2014 NFLPA Collegiate Bowl, where he connected on a 39-yard field goal and recorded one tackle on a kickoff return.

Professional career

Kansas City Chiefs

2014 season

Santos was signed as an undrafted free agent by the Kansas City Chiefs on 19 May 2014. He was named the Chiefs kicker on 30 August 2014, beating veteran Ryan Succop for the position. On 7 September 2014, he became the first Brazilian born player ever to play in an NFL regular season game in a 26–10 loss to the Tennessee Titans, kicking his first career field goal. After missing two field goals in his first two games, he made his next 13 field goal attempts, including a clutch game-winning field goal with 26 seconds left in a Week 7 win over the San Diego Chargers and a 53-yard field goal the following week against the St. Louis Rams.

Santos was the team leader whose 113 points were the most by a rookie player in Chiefs history.
He also made most field goals (25) by a rookie kicker in Chiefs history (tied with Ryan Succop).

2015 season

In a 21–36 loss to the Cincinnati Bengals on October 4, Santos kicked a team record seven field goals, including two over 50 yards. His seven field goals tied him with five players for the second most all-time in a single game.

In Week 10, Santos made five field goals of six attempts against the Denver Broncos, the second game in the season with at least five field goals made.

In Week 15, Santos kicked a 53-yard field goal against the Baltimore Ravens. This was the fourth field goal with at least 50 yards in the season.

In a 30–0 victory against the Houston Texans in the AFC Wild Card game, Cairo Santos became the first Brazilian player to play in a National Football League playoffs game. He made three field goals and three extra point attempts. He kicked two 49-yard field goals, the longest field goals in the Chiefs postseason history.

In his second postseason game, Santos made two field goals in a 20–27 loss to the New England Patriots in the AFC Divisional Playoffs game.

2016 season

In Week 2, Santos kicked a 54-yard field goal in a 12–19 loss to the Houston Texans, the longest field goal of his professional career.

Santos made two field goals in the 30–27 overtime victory against Denver Broncos including the game-winner, a 34-yard field goal attempt that bounced off the left upright.

In November, Santos was named AFC Special Teams Player of the Month for the first time after converting 11 of 11 field goals and all five extra points.

2017 season

After missing much of training camp and the preseason with a groin injury, Santos returned at the start of the regular season. He started by converting all six extra point attempts in a 42–27 victory over the New England Patriots on Thursday Night Football. On 26 September 2017, the Kansas City Chiefs placed Santos on injured reserve. On 30 September 2017, the Kansas City Chiefs waived Santos from injured reserve.

Chicago Bears

On 20 November 2017, Santos signed with the Chicago Bears.
Santos missed his first field-goal attempt as a member of the Bears, a 54-yarder. On 4 December, Santos was placed on injured reserve after hurting his groin in pregame warmups in Week 13 against the San Francisco 49ers.

New York Jets

On 15 March 2018, Santos signed a one-year contract with the New York Jets. He was released on 22 August 2018.

Los Angeles Rams

On 2 October 2018, Santos signed with the Los Angeles Rams to serve as their starting kicker while Greg Zuerlein recovered from a groin injury. In his first game, he made a game-winning 39-yard field goal in a 33–31 victory over the Seattle Seahawks. He was released on 16 October 2018 after two games once Zuerlein was deemed healthy.

Tampa Bay Buccaneers

On 12 November 2018, Santos was signed by the Tampa Bay Buccaneers after Chandler Catanzaro was released. In his Tampa Bay debut, he was perfect on all five extra-point attempts in the 38–35 loss to the New York Giants in Week 11. In Week 15, Santos made his 100th career field goal in the 20–12 loss to the Baltimore Ravens.

On 13 March 2019, Santos re-signed with the Buccaneers. On 31 August, Santos was released by the Buccaneers.

Tennessee Titans

On 4 September 2019, Santos was signed by the Tennessee Titans after Ryan Succop was placed on injured reserve. Santos was perfect in his team debut, connecting on two field-goal attempts as well as all five of his extra-point attempts in a 43–13 victory over the Cleveland Browns. On 6 October, in a 14–7 Week 5 loss to the Buffalo Bills, Santos missed four field goal attempts while also making an extra point. He was released by the Titans the next day.

Chicago Bears (second stint)

2020 season

Santos signed with the Chicago Bears on 25 August 2020. He was released on 5 September during final roster cuts, and was placed on the team's practice squad a day later. He was elevated to the active roster a day before the 2020 season opener against the Detroit Lions following starting kicker Eddy Piñeiro's placement on injured reserve. Santos made both of his field goal attempts (35 and 28 yards) and all three extra points as the Bears won 27–23. He reverted to the practice squad a day later before being promoted to the 53-man roster on September 16. Against the Tampa Bay Buccaneers in Week 4, he made the game-winning 38-yard field goal with 1:19 remaining. Two weeks later against the Carolina Panthers, he converted a career-long 55-yard field goal as the Bears won 23–17; he was later named NFC Special Teams Player of the Week. Santos was named the NFC Special Teams Player of the Month for his performance in December. Santos finished the 2020 season by making 30 of 32 field goal attempts. He also kicked a franchise-high 27 consecutive successful field goals during the season.

2021 season
On 11 March 2021, Santos signed a three-year contract extension with the Bears worth $9 million. In 2021, Santos continued his success from the previous season, making his first 13 attempted field goals in the season and extending his streak of consecutive made field goals from the previous season to 40. This streak was broken during Bears' Week 9 game against the Pittsburgh Steelers, when he was sent out to attempt a 65-yard field goal with 0:02 seconds remaining in the fourth quarter which fell short, conserving the Steelers' 29-27 win. Following the bye week, Santos made 13 of his 16 attempted field goals over the final eight games of the season, and finished the season going 26 for 30 on field goals and 27 for 28 on extra points.

2022 season
In Week 7, Santos made all four field goals and all three extra points in a 33-14 win over the New England Patriots, earning NFC Special Teams Player of the Week.

NFL career statistics

Regular season

Postseason

Accomplishments and records

NFL
 2nd most field goals made, game (tied with other 5 players): 7 on 4 October 2015
 2nd most field goals made, no misses, game (tied with other 3 players): 7

Kansas City Chiefs
 Most points by a kicker, game: 21 on 4 October 2015
 Most field goals made, game: 7
 Most field goals made, game (playoffs) (tied with other 3 players): 3 on 9 January 2016
 Most field goals made, no misses, game: 7
 Most field goals attempted, game (tied with Jan Stenerud): 7
 Most field goals, 50+ yards, season (tied with Nick Lowery and Harrison Butker): 4, 2015
 Most field goals, 50+ yards, game (tied with other 3 players): 2 on 4 October 2015
 Most games, 2+ field goals made, season (tied with other 3 players): 10, 2016
 Longest field goal made, playoffs: 49 (twice) on 9 January 2016
 2nd highest field goal percentage, career (min. 100 attempts): 84.8

Chicago Bears
 Most consecutive made field goals (40)
 Most consecutive made field goals in a single season (27) in 2020
 Highest single-season field goal completion percentage (92.8%)

College
 Lou Groza Award (2012)
 Consensus All-American (2012)

Personal life
On 15 September 2013, Santos' father died in a plane crash in Brazil. "I used to talk to my dad every day, all the time. We were very close. He was my biggest fan, very supportive of my career, always wishing me to do well, no matter what. He will always be there for me. I know. After each successful kick or game I always think about him. I point my fingers to the sky in honor of him."

In the 2016 "My Cause My Cleats" NFL campaign, Santos honored Chapecoense, a Brazilian association football club, due to the aircraft crash that occurred with the delegation of the club killing 71 people in Colombia on 28 November 2016.

References

External links
Kansas City Chiefs bio
Tulane Greenwave bio

1991 births
Living people
All-American college football players
American football placekickers
Brazilian expatriate sportspeople in the United States
Brazilian players of American football
Chicago Bears players
Kansas City Chiefs players
Los Angeles Rams players
New York Jets players
People from Limeira
People from St. Augustine, Florida
Players of American football from Florida
Tulane Green Wave football players
Tampa Bay Buccaneers players
Tennessee Titans players
Sportspeople from São Paulo (state)